Kodi Jacques (born 27 September 2000) is an Australian rules footballer playing for Essendon in the AFL Women's (AFLW). Jacques signed with Richmond during the first period of the 2019 expansion club signing period in August. She made her debut against  at Ikon Park in the opening round of the 2020 season.

In March 2023, Jacques was traded to Essendon in exchange for a second round pick.

Statistics
Statistics are correct to round 3, 2022

|- style="background-color: #eaeaea"
! scope="row" style="text-align:center" | 2020
|style="text-align:center;"|
| 10 || 6 || 1 || 0 || 37 || 12 || 49 || 7 || 32 || 0.2 || 0.0 || 6.2 || 2.0 || 8.2 || 1.2 || 5.3
|-
| scope="row" style="text-align:center" | 2021
|
| 10 || 9 || 1 || 2 || 37 || 29 || 66 || 7 || 20 || 0.1 || 0.2 || 4.1 || 3.2 || 7.3 || 0.8 || 2.2
|- style="background:#EAEAEA"
| scope="row" text-align:center | 2022
| 
| 10 || 2 || 1 || 0 || 4 || 6 || 10 || 3 || 5 || 0.5 || 0.0 || 2.0 || 3.0 || 5.0 || 1.5 || 2.5
|- 
|- class="sortbottom"
! colspan=3| Career
! 17
! 3
! 2
! 78
! 47
! 125
! 17
! 57
! 0.2
! 0.1
! 4.6
! 2.8
! 7.4
! 1.0
! 3.4
|}

References

External links 

  
 

2000 births
Living people
Richmond Football Club (AFLW) players
Australian rules footballers from Victoria (Australia)